Michel Proulx is a Genie Award winning production designer and art director. He earned a Genie Award for Best Achievement in Art Direction/Production Design for The Rocket. He was previously nominated five times for Genie Awards, among other nominations.

External links
 

1946 births
Canadian art directors
Best Art Direction/Production Design Genie and Canadian Screen Award winners
Living people
People from Montreal
Canadian production designers